Thomas Chapel A.M.E. Zion Church is a historic African Methodist Episcopal church located at Black Mountain, Buncombe County, North Carolina. It was built in 1922 by descendants of freed slaves, and is a one-story, frame building with Gothic Revival design influences.  It is sheathed in weatherboard and features a tall, pyramidal-roof bell tower.

This church may have always been called "Thomas Chapel", but a predecessor "Tom's Chapel", named for one of its builders, was built around 1892.

It was deemed locally significant as an intact example of a Gothic Revival-influenced church and was listed on the National Register of Historic Places in 2009.

References

20th-century African Methodist Episcopal church buildings
African Methodist Episcopal churches in North Carolina
Churches on the National Register of Historic Places in North Carolina
Carpenter Gothic church buildings in North Carolina
Churches completed in 1922
Churches in Buncombe County, North Carolina
National Register of Historic Places in Buncombe County, North Carolina